Frank Albrechtsen (born 16 March 1932) was a former association football player who represented New Zealand at international level.

Born in New Plymouth and educated at New Plymouth Boys' High School, Albrechtsen played for the New Plymouth Old Boys club and represented Taranaki.

Albrechtsen played three official A-international matches and five non-cap friendlies for New Zealand on a ten match tour of Fiji and Tahiti in 1952. Albrechtsen won his international caps against Pacific neighbours Fiji, the first match a 2–0 win on 7 September, followed by 9-0 and 5-2 wins on 14 September and 16 September respectively.

His five non-cap matches for New Zealand were against, Suva F.C. Southern Districts, Lautoka F.C. and Northern Districts in Fiji, followed by a single match in Tahiti against a resident Chinese selection.

Albrechtsen died in June 2021 at New Plymouth.

References 

1932 births
Living people
New Zealand association footballers
New Zealand international footballers
People educated at New Plymouth Boys' High School
Association football defenders
Sportspeople from New Plymouth